Jan Jaroš (born 11 November 1984) is a former motorcycle speedway rider from the Czech Republic.

Speedway career
He rode in the top tier of British Speedway riding for Belle Vue Aces during the 2004 Elite League speedway season and Ipswich Witches during the 2006 Elite League speedway season. He also rode in the second division for King's Lynn Stars, in 2003 and 2005.

References 

1984 births
Living people
Czech speedway riders
Belle Vue Aces riders
Ipswich Witches riders
King's Lynn Stars riders
People from Strakonice
Sportspeople from the South Bohemian Region